REAL District, formerly known as Evraz Place and Regina Exhibition Park, is a 102-acre (0.41 km2) sport complex and exhibition grounds in Regina, Saskatchewan, operated by the Regina Exhibition Association Limited (REAL). The area is home to Mosaic Stadium, an outdoor stadium and home of the Saskatchewan Roughriders, and Brandt Centre, an indoor arena and home of the Regina Pats. Brandt Centre is connected to an interconnected series of various convention and sports facilities, including the Viterra International Trade Centre, Canada Place, the AffinityPlex (a multi-purpose indoor area that also supports an indoor soccer field. Formerly known as the "EventPlex," but sponsored by Affinity Credit Union since September 2018), the Queensbury Convention Centre (a convention and banquet facility), and The Co-operators Centre, a six-rink hockey facility. The complex is host site of the Queen City Ex, as well as Canadian Western Agribition and Canada's Farm Show.

The Regina Exhibition Stadium, a historic indoor arena constructed in 1919, was demolished in 2017 in order to construct the new International Trade Centre, a $37 million, 150,000 square-feet convention space.

Naming rights to the site were previously held by IPSCO, and British steel company Evraz. In March 2022, REAL announced that the site would be renamed "REAL District", in order to place a larger emphasis on REAL's involvement in the facilities, and the individual facilities' naming rights. The association also stated that it had inadvertently received shipments, phone calls, and resumes from entities who thought Evraz Place was a company office. REAL denied that the 2022 Russian invasion of Ukraine was the main impetus for dropping the naming rights (while domiciled in the United Kingdom, the largest shareholder of the company is Russian), as the contract had expired in May 2021, but that it was announced sooner than scheduled due to the crisis. REAL also discussed plans for further expansion, including a new distillery under construction, and plans for a new hotel.

References

External links

Neighbourhoods in Regina, Saskatchewan
Sports venues in Saskatchewan
Sports complexes
Fairgrounds in Canada